The Armitage River is a tributary of Chibougamau Lake, flowing in the town of Chibougamau, in Jamésie, in the administrative region of Nord-du-Québec, in the province of Quebec, in Canada.

The course of the river flows in the townships of Lemoine and Dollier.

The hydrographic slope of the Armitage River is accessible by the junction of a forest road serving the eastern side of Chibougamau Lake; the latter is connected by the North to route 167 which also serves the south side of Waconichi Lake and the Waconichi River. This last road comes from Chibougamau, going north-east to the south-eastern part of Mistassini Lake.

The surface of the Armitage River is usually frozen from early November to mid-May, however safe ice circulation is generally from mid-November to mid-April.

Geography

Toponymy 
This hydronym evokes the life work of Reginald S. Armitage (1892-1955), vice-president of the forestry company Price Brothers Limited. Armitage has played a major role as a pioneer and promoter of the development of the natural wealth of the region.

The toponym "Armitage River" was formalized on December 5, 1968, at the Commission de toponymie du Québec, that is to say, the foundation of this commission.

References

See also 

Rivers of Nord-du-Québec
Nottaway River drainage basin
Eeyou Istchee James Bay